The Brutal Telling is a novel written by Louise Penny, part of the Chief Inspector Armand Gamache series.  It was published by Minotaur Books, an imprint of St. Martin's Press owned by Macmillan Publishers.  The book was published on 22 September 2009, and later went on to win the Anthony Award for Best Novel in 2010.

Plot summary
The body of a man is found in the bistro in Three Pines. Investigations lead to a mysterious cottage in the nearby woods.  Greed and revenge play a part.

References 

2009 Canadian novels
Novels by Louise Penny
Anthony Award-winning works
Minotaur Books books